Cayo was a hundred, a geographic division, in the traditional county of Carmarthenshire, Wales. It is named after the village of Caio, also spelt Caeo, Cayo, Caiau.

Hundreds of Carmarthenshire